Slowly evolving immune-mediated diabetes, or latent autoimmune diabetes in adults (LADA), is a form of diabetes that exhibits clinical features similar to both type 1 diabetes (T1D) and type 2 diabetes (T2D), and is sometimes referred to as type 1.5 diabetes. It is an autoimmune form of diabetes, similar to T1D, but patients with LADA often show insulin resistance, similar to T2D, and share some risk factors for the disease with T2D. Studies have shown that LADA patients have certain types of antibodies against the insulin-producing cells, and that these cells stop producing insulin more slowly than in T1D patients.

LADA appears to share genetic risk factors with both T1D and T2D but is genetically distinct from both. Within the LADA patient group, a genetic and phenotypic heterogeneity has been observed with varying degrees of insulin resistance and autoimmunity. With the knowledge we have today, LADA can thus be described as a hybrid form of T1D and T2D, showing phenotypic and genotypic similarities with both, as well as variation within LADA regarding the degree of autoimmunity and insulin resistance.

The concept of LADA was first introduced in 1993, though The Expert Committee on the Diagnosis and Classification of Diabetes Mellitus does not recognize the term, instead including it under the standard definition of diabetes mellitus type 1.

Symptoms
The symptoms of latent autoimmune diabetes in adults are similar to those of other forms of diabetes: polydipsia (excessive thirst and drinking), polyuria (excessive urination), and often blurred vision. Compared to juvenile type 1 diabetes, the symptoms develop comparatively slowly, over a period of at least six months.

Diagnosis
A fasting blood sugar level of ≥ 7.0 mmol / L (126 mg/dL) is used in the general diagnosis of diabetes. There are no clear guidelines for the diagnosis of LADA, but the criteria often used are that the patient should develop the disease in adulthood, not need insulin treatment for the first 6 months after diagnosis and have autoantibodies in the blood.

Glutamic acid decarboxylase autoantibody (GADA), islet cell autoantibody (ICA), insulinoma-associated (IA-2) autoantibody, and zinc transporter autoantibody (ZnT8) testing should be performed in order to correctly diagnose diabetes.

Persons with LADA typically have low, although sometimes moderate, levels of C-peptide as the disease progresses. Those with insulin resistance or type 2 diabetes are more likely to have high levels of C-peptide due to an over production of insulin.

Autoantibodies

Glutamic acid decarboxylase autoantibodies (GADA), islet cell autoantibodies (ICA), insulinoma-associated (IA-2) autoantibodies, and zinc transporter autoantibodies (ZnT8) are all associated with LADA; GADAs are commonly found in cases of diabetes mellitus type 1.

The presence of islet cell complement fixing autoantibodies also aids in a differential diagnosis between LADA and type 2 diabetes. Persons with LADA often test positive for ICA, whereas type 2 diabetics only seldom do.

Persons with LADA usually test positive for glutamic acid decarboxylase antibodies, whereas in type 1 diabetes these antibodies are more commonly seen in adults rather than in children. In addition to being useful in making an early diagnosis for type 1 diabetes mellitus, GAD antibodies tests are used for differential diagnosis between LADA and type 2 diabetes and may also be used for differential diagnosis of gestational diabetes, risk prediction in immediate family members for type 1, as well as a tool to monitor prognosis of the clinical progression of type 1 diabetes.

Prevalence 
Since there is no regular autoantibody screening, patients with LADA are at risk of being diagnosed with type 2 diabetes, which makes it difficult to estimate the prevalence of LADA. Globally, it is estimated that about 8.5% of adults have some form of diabetes and it is estimated that LADA accounts for about 3-12% of all adult diabetes cases. Estimates from 2015 are saying that there could be as many as 10–20% of people with diabetes having LADA.

Risk factors 
There is limited research on LADA and its etiology. As with both T1D and T2D, the risk of LADA depends on both genetic and environmental factors. Genetic risk factors for LADA are similar to T1D, i.e. is affected by the HLA complex, but also genetic variants associated with T2D have been identified in LADA. LADA has several lifestyle risk factors in common with T2D, such as obesity, physical inactivity, smoking and consumption of sweetened beverages, all of which are linked to insulin resistance.

Obesity has been shown to increase the risk of LADA in several studies, and one study showed that the risk was particularly high in combination with having diabetes in the family. Physical activity also affects the risk of LADA, with less physical activity increasing the risk. A Swedish study showed that low birth weight, in addition to increasing the risk of T2D, increases the risk of LADA.

Although smoking has been shown to increase the risk of T2D while coffee consumption has been shown to reduce the risk of T2D, the results regarding these products and LADA are unclear. However, results from two studies based on the same population seem to indicate that coffee consumption increases the risk of LADA. Other foods that have been shown to increase the risk of LADA are sweetened beverages and processed red meat while consumption of fatty fish has been shown to have a protective effect.

Management

Diabetes is a chronic disease, i.e. it cannot be cured, but symptoms and complications can be minimized with proper treatment. Diabetes can lead to elevated blood sugar levels, which in turn can lead to damage to the heart, blood vessels, kidneys, eyes and nerves. There are very few studies on how to treat LADA, specifically, which is probably due to difficulties in classifying and diagnosing the disease. LADA patients often do not need insulin treatment immediately after being diagnosed because their own insulin production decreases more slowly than T1D patients, but in the long run they will need it. About 80% of all LADA patients initially misdiagnosed with type 2 (and who have GAD antibodies) will become insulin-dependent within 3 to 15 years (according to differing LADA sources).

The treatment for Type 1 diabetes/LADA is exogenous insulin to control glucose levels, prevent further destruction of residual beta cells, reduce the possibility of diabetic complications, and prevent death from diabetic ketoacidosis (DKA). Although LADA may appear to initially respond to similar treatment (lifestyle and medications) as type 2 diabetes, it will not halt or slow the progression of beta cell destruction, and people with LADA will eventually become insulin-dependent. People with LADA have insulin resistance similar to long-term type 1 diabetes; some studies showed that people with LADA have less insulin resistance, compared with those with type 2 diabetes; however, others have not found a difference.

A Cochrane systematic review from 2011 showed that treatment with Sulphonylurea did not improve control of glucose levels more than insulin at 3 nor 12 months of treatment. This same review actually found evidence that treatment with Sulphonylurea could lead to earlier insulin dependence, with 30% of cases requiring insulin at 2 years. When studies measured fasting C-peptide, no intervention influenced its concentration, but insulin maintained concentration better compared to Sulphonylurea. The authors also examined a study utilizing Glutamic Acid Decarboxylase formulated with aluminium hydroxide (GAD65), which showed improvements in C-peptide levels that were maintained for 5 years. Vitamin D with insulin also demonstrated steady fasting C-peptide levels in the vitamin group, with the same levels declining in the insulin-only group at a 12-month follow-up. One study examining the effects of Chinese remedies on fasting C-peptide on a 3-month follow-up did not show a difference compared to insulin alone. Still, it is important to highlight that the studies available to be included in this review presented considerable flaws in quality and design.

History

Although type 1 diabetes has been identified as an autoimmune disease since the 1970s, the concept of latent autoimmune diabetes mellitus was not noted until 1993, when it was used to describe slow-onset type 1 autoimmune diabetes occurring in adults.  This followed the concept that GAD autoantibodies were a feature of type 1 diabetes and not type 2 diabetes.

References

Sources

External links 

Diabetes
Autoimmune diseases